Rumi is a Persian-language opera by Iranian composer Behzad Abdi to a libretto by puppet theatre director Behrouz Gharibpour. The opera combines Persian traditional dastgāh modal system and sama dance with Western music. The libretto is based on the story of Shams and Rumi.

Recording
 Rumi – Maliheh Moradi, Mohammad Motamedi, Homayun Shajarian, Hosein Alishapour and Ali Khodaei, Mohammadreza Sadeghi, Credo Chamber Choir National Symphony Orchestra of Ukraine Vladimir Sirenko 2018

References

Persian-language operas
2009 operas
Operas